Radovan Ivković (born 26 March 1989) is a Serbian football forward who plays for ČSK Čelarevo.

Club career
Born in Virovitica, Ivković started his career with ČSK Čelarevo. As a young footballer, he spent some period as a loaned player with lower ranked clubs Krila Krajine, OFK Futog and OFK Bačka, where he scored 10 goals on 44 Serbian League Vojvodina matches for 2 seasons. He returned to ČSK Čelarevo for the 2010–11 Serbian League Vojvodina season and during the season he scored 12 goals on 28 league matches. Later he played for Vupik Vukovar and BSK Bijelo Brdo in Croatia, before he signed his second spell with OFK Bačka as a single player. He contributed in winning Serbian League Vojvodina with 8 goals on 25 matches for the 2013–14 season. During 2015, Ivković was loaned to Milton SC, where he scored several goals in the Canadian Soccer League.

Personal life
His younger brother is Saša Ivković.

Honours
OFK Bačka
Vojvodina League West: 2012–13
Serbian League Vojvodina: 2013–14

References

External links
 
 
 

1989 births
Living people
Sportspeople from Virovitica
Association football forwards
Croatian footballers
Serbian footballers
FK ČSK Čelarevo players
OFK Bačka players
NK BSK Bijelo Brdo players
Milton SC players
FK Hajduk Kula players
Serbian First League players
Serbian SuperLiga players
Canadian Soccer League (1998–present) players
Croatian expatriate footballers
Expatriate soccer players in Canada
Croatian expatriate sportspeople in Canada
Serbian expatriate footballers
Serbian expatriate sportspeople in Canada

Serbian League players